The  Scottish Football Federation was an association football competition formed in 1891 which ran for just two seasons.  The proposal for a competition came from seven clubs (Falkirk, King's Park, Royal Albert, Glasgow Wanderers, Pollokshaws, Kilmarnock Athletic, and Arthurlie) which had been overlooked for the Scottish League and Scottish Football Alliance.

In 1893 it was absorbed by the Scottish Football Alliance when that league lost all but one of its members to the Scottish Football League's new Division Two.

1891–92
{| class="wikitable" style="text–align: center;"
|-
!width=30|Pos
!width=140|Team
!width=30|Pld
!width=30|W
!width=30|D
!width=30|L
!width=30|GF
!width=30|GA
!width=30|PTS
|- style="background:#33FF00;"
|1
|Arthurlie
|22
|16
|3
|3
|107
|38
|35
|-
|2
|Albion Rovers
|22
|15
|1
|6
|88
|51
|31
|-
|3
|Hurlford
|22
|11
|4
|7
|58
|51
|26
|-
|4
|Falkirk
|21
|11
|3
|7
|61
|49
|25
|-
|5
|Wishaw Thistle
|22
|10
|4
|8
|69
|71
|24
|-
|6
|Pollokshaws
|22
|10
|2
|10
|73
|58
|22
|-
|7
|Royal Albert
|22
|10
|1
|11
|70
|54
|21
|-
|8
|Kilmarnock Athletic
|22
|7
|3
|12
|51
|67
|17
|-
|9
|Clydebank
|22
|7
|3
|12
|46
|87
|17
|-
|10
|Glasgow Wanderers
|22
|7
|2
|13
|44
|88
|16
|-
|11
|Burnbank Swifts
|21
|4
|6
|11
|49
|80
|14
|-
|12
|Motherwell
|22
|4
|6
|12
|58
|80
|14
|}
Burnbank Swifts v Falkirk was not played

1892–93

Champions
1891–92 - Arthurlie
1892–93 - Royal Albert

Member clubs
Albion Rovers 1891–1893
Arthurlie 1891–1893
Burnbank Swifts 1891–1892
Clydebank
East Stirlingshire 1892–1893
Falkirk 1891–1893
Glasgow Wanderers 1891–1893
Hurlford 1891–1893
Kilmarnock Athletic 1891–1893
Motherwell 1891–1893
Neilston 1892–1893
Pollokshaws 1891–1893
Royal Albert 1891–1893
Wishaw Thistle 1891–1893

References

Defunct football leagues in Scotland
1891 establishments in Scotland
Sports leagues established in 1891
Sports leagues disestablished in 1893
1893 disestablishments in Scotland